George Thomas Barclay (May 24, 1910 – October 6, 1997) was an American college football player and coach. He served as the head football coach at Washington and Lee University from 1949 to 1951 and at the University of North Carolina at Chapel Hill from 1953 to 1955, compiling a career college football head coaching record of 28–30–2. Barclay was a standout guard and linebacker at North Carolina. He was a three-year starting player from 1932 to 1934. Barclay made the first team All-Southern Conference as a guard in 1933 and 1934 and was an All-American in 1934.

Early life and playing career
A native of Natrona, Pennsylvania, Barclay attended The Kiski School in Saltsburg, Pennsylvania.

Coaching career
While serving as head coach at Washington and Lee University, Barclay took the Generals to their only postseason bowl appearance, leading the 1950 Washington and Lee Generals football team to the Gator Bowl, where they were beaten by Wyoming. He was named the Southern Conference and Virginia Coach of the Year. Barclay became an assistant coach at Carolina under Carl Snavely. Snavely was a proponent of the single-wing offense but thought Carolina's players were more suited to the split-T formation, and Barclay helped install it there. In 1953, he was hired as the head football coach. Barclay was dismissed from his alma mater in 1955, and replaced by Jim Tatum, who had been a teammate with him at Carolina.

Death and honors
Barclay died in the early morning hours of October 6, 1997, at his home in Asheville, North Carolina, following a heart attack. The George Barclay Award for outstanding linebacker at North Carolina named in his honor. He was inducted to the North Carolina Sports Hall of Fame in 1976. Barclay Road in Chapel Hill, North Carolina is named after him.

Head coaching record

Football

Ice hockey

References

External links
 

1910 births
1997 deaths
American football guards
American football linebackers
Dartmouth Big Green football coaches
Dartmouth Big Green men's ice hockey coaches
Georgia Pre-Flight Skycrackers football coaches
Maryland Terrapins football coaches
North Carolina Tar Heels football coaches
North Carolina Tar Heels football players
Oberlin Yeomen football coaches
VMI Keydets football coaches
Washington and Lee Generals football coaches
The Kiski School alumni
People from Harrison Township, Allegheny County, Pennsylvania
Sportspeople from the Pittsburgh metropolitan area
Coaches of American football from Pennsylvania
Players of American football from Pennsylvania